The 1998–99 AHL season was the 63rd season of the American Hockey League. Nineteen teams played 80 games each in the schedule. The Providence Bruins finished first overall in the regular season, and won their first Calder Cup championship.

Team changes
The Lowell Lock Monsters join the AHL as an expansion team, based in Lowell, Massachusetts, playing in the Atlantic Division.

Final standings
Note: GP = Games played; W = Wins; L = Losses; T = Ties; OTL = Overtime losses; GF = Goals for; GA = Goals against; Pts = Points;

Eastern Conference

Western Conference

Scoring leaders

Note: GP = Games played; G = Goals; A = Assists; Pts = Points; PIM = Penalty minutes

 complete list

Calder Cup playoffs

All Star Classic
The 12th AHL All-Star Game was played on January 25, 1999, at the First Union Center in Philadelphia. Team PlanetUSA defeated Team Canada 5-4 in a shootout. In the skills competition held the day before the All-Star Game, Team Canada won 15-12 over Team PlanetUSA.

Trophy and award winners

Team awards

Individual awards

Other awards

See also
List of AHL seasons

References
AHL official site
AHL Hall of Fame
HockeyDB

 
American Hockey League seasons
2
2